Route 7 is a national road in the South American Andean state of Bolivia.

Route description 
It begins in the valley of Cochabamba at about  altitude, accompanies the eastern Andes chain of the Cordillera Central and finally ends at about  altitude in Santa Cruz between the river valleys of the Piray River and the Río Grande. On its way, the road only crosses the two departments of Cochabamba and Santa Cruz.

The entire route of Route 7 is paved.

History 
Route 7 was declared part of the Bolivian national road network "Red Vial Fundamental" by decree 25.134 of 31 August 1998.

The Colomi bus crash took place on Route 7.

References

Roads in Bolivia